Dressage is a 2018 Iranian film directed by Pooya Badkoobeh. The film tells the story of a 16-year-old girl and her problems and reflects social divisions within contemporary Iranian society and indicts a middle and upper class that have lost their moral centre. This drama is the directorial debut of Pooya Badkoobeh.

Cast
 Negar Moghaddam as Golsa
 Yasna Mirtahmasb as Amir
 Ali Mosaffa as Golsa's father
 Shabnam Moghadami as Golsa's mother
 Behafarid Ghafarian as Shirin

Reception
Dressage was nominated for Best First Film and received a Special Jury Mention at the 2018 Berlin International Film Festival's Generation 14-Plus Awards. At the 2018 Shanghai International Film Festival, Negar Moghaddam won the Asian New Talent Award for Best Actress.

References

External links
 

2018 films
2018 drama films
Iranian drama films
2010s Persian-language films
Films set in Iran